is a 2010 Japanese drama film directed by Hisayasu Satō and based on a book by Atsuhiko Nakamura.

Plot
Lulu and Ayano are porn actresses who encounter issues that derive from working in that industry.

Cast
 Norie Yasui as Lulu
 Mayu Sakuma as Ayano

References

External links
 
 Review at Twitch Film

2010 films
2010 drama films
Films based on non-fiction books
Films directed by Hisayasu Satō
Japanese drama films
Films about pornography
2010s Japanese-language films
2010s Japanese films